In electrical engineering, a node is any region on a circuit between two circuit elements. In circuit diagrams, connections are ideal wires with zero resistance, so a node consists of the entire section of wire between elements, not just a single point.

Details

showing that the electric potential at every point of a node is the same.

There are some notable exceptions where the voltage difference is large enough to become significant:
 High-precision resistance measurements using a Kelvin connection
 The difference in voltage between ground and neutral, between the neutral wire and the ground in domestic AC power plugs and sockets, can be fatal. A properly installed electrical system connects them together at only one location, leading many people to the fatally incorrect conclusion that they are at "the same" voltage, or that the safety ground is "redundant and unnecessary"
 The Seebeck effect and the Peltier effect
 Joints involving aluminium wire

Dots used to mark nodes on a circuit diagram are sometimes referred to as meatballs.

References

Electricity